Ellie Green (born 21 January 2001, Epsom) is an English rugby union player. She plays for Harlequins Women at club level and was a member of England's 2021 Women's Six Nations squad.

International career 
She was a consistent member of the England U20s team and was called up to the senior side as part of the England squad for the 2021 Women's Six Nations Championships.

Club career 
Green joined Harlequins Women during the 2017/18 season. She has consistently finished as the top points scorer for the side.

Early life and education 
Green followed in the footsteps of her older brother and sister who played rugby from a very young age. Her father was also a rugby coach. Green's brother Harry was forced to quit rugby due to illness.

She started playing at Sutton and Epsom and went on to play for Beccehamians as it was the closest girls' full team that played regular matches.

At school, Green also played hockey and had to choose which of the two sports to pursue: she chose rugby.

She studied maths, biology and PE at A Level at Reigate Grammar School and went on to study for a degree at the University of Surrey.

References 

2001 births
Living people
English female rugby union players
English rugby union players
Female rugby union players
Rugby union players from Epsom
21st-century English women